Cristian Óscar Maidana (born January 24, 1987) is an Argentine footballer who plays as a winger for Los Andes.

Club career

Banfield
Maidana made his professional debut for Banfield in 2006, and rapidly established himself as a regular first-team player.

Europe
In December 2007, the Argentine club reached an agreement with Spartak Moscow for Maidana's transfer to the Russian side for a $3.5 million fee.

On January 16, 2009 he was loaned to Recreativo Huelva.

In the second half of the year, he returned to Spartak but was seriously injured in his very first game after the comeback (a Russian Cup match against FC Moscow).

Latin America
On December 14, 2010, Maidana was loaned to Huracán, back in Argentina.

In the middle of 2011 he signed with the club Rangers de Talca of Chile, being together with Gabriel Roth, star reinforcements for the talquino team which won promotion to the first division. In early 2012, renewed its link with Rangers for the next 2 seasons.

On July 19, 2012 the Rangers president, Richard Pini, confirmed his move to Atlante of Mexico. On July 26, 2012, Jose Antonio Garcia, CEO of Atlante confirmed his arrival at the club.

For the 2013-2014 season Maidana returned to Argentina to play for Argentinos Juniors.

Philadelphia Union
Maidana signed with Major League Soccer club Philadelphia Union on January 15, 2014. His first goal for the Union was the winning goal in a 2-1 win at Sporting Kansas City on May 14, 2014.

Houston Dynamo
On December 7, 2015, Maidana was traded to Houston Dynamo alongside teammate Andrew Wenger in exchange for allocation money and the #6 selection in the 2016 MLS SuperDraft.

International career
Maidana made his debut for Argentina U20 on May 18, 2006 in the Toulon Tournament in a 1-0 loss to China. He traveled with Argentina  for the 2006 World Cup as an extra player for training purposes.

References

External links
Guardian statistics

Cristian Maidana at Soccerway

1987 births
Living people
People from Resistencia, Chaco
Argentine footballers
Argentine expatriate footballers
Association football midfielders
Argentine Primera División players
Club Atlético Banfield footballers
Club Atlético Huracán footballers
FC Spartak Moscow players
Recreativo de Huelva players
Rangers de Talca footballers
Atlante F.C. footballers
Philadelphia Union players
Houston Dynamo FC players
Al Ahli SC (Doha) players
Centro Sportivo Alagoano players
Primera B de Chile players
Russian Premier League players
La Liga players
Liga MX players
Major League Soccer players
Designated Players (MLS)
Qatar Stars League players
Campeonato Brasileiro Série A players
Expatriate footballers in Chile
Expatriate footballers in Russia
Expatriate footballers in Mexico
Expatriate footballers in Spain
Expatriate footballers in Brazil
Argentine expatriate sportspeople in Chile
Argentine expatriate sportspeople in Russia
Argentine expatriate sportspeople in Spain
Argentine expatriate sportspeople in Brazil
Expatriate footballers in Qatar
Sportspeople from Chaco Province